Inna Matveyeva (born 12 October 1978) is a retired Kazakhstani female volleyball player. She is a member of the Kazakhstan women's national volleyball team and played for Irtysh Kazchrome in 2014.

She participated in the 2008 Summer Olympics.
She was part of the Kazakhstani national team at the 2014 FIVB Volleyball Women's World Championship in Italy.

Clubs
  Irtysh Kazchrome (2014)

References

External links
 http://italy2014.fivb.org/en/competition/teams/kaz-kazakhstan/players/inna-matveyeva?id=41655
 http://www.scoresway.com/?sport=volleyball&page=player&id=368
 http://www.eurosport.com/volleyball/inna-matveyeva_prs253931/person.shtml
 http://clubworldchampionships.2016.women.fivb.com/en/news/nine-clubs-to-compete-for-asian-title?id=56745
http://www.gettyimages.com/detail/news-photo/kazakhstans-olga-nassedkina-and-inna-matveyeva-defend-as-news-photo/90594078#kazakhstans-olga-nassedkina-and-inna-matveyeva-defend-as-thailands-picture-id90594078

1978 births
Living people
Kazakhstani women's volleyball players
People from Ridder, Kazakhstan
Volleyball players at the 2008 Summer Olympics
Olympic volleyball players of Kazakhstan
Asian Games medalists in volleyball
Volleyball players at the 2006 Asian Games
Volleyball players at the 2010 Asian Games
Medalists at the 2010 Asian Games
Asian Games bronze medalists for Kazakhstan